Center Grove Township is one of twelve townships in Dickinson County, Iowa, USA.  As of the 2000 census, its population was 7,478.

History
Center Grove Township was formed in 1866.

Geography
According to the United States Census Bureau, Center Grove Township covers an area of 36.15 square miles (93.63 square kilometers); of this, 31.38 square miles (81.28 square kilometers, 86.81 percent) is land and 4.77 square miles (12.35 square kilometers, 13.19 percent) is water.

Cities, towns, villages
 Arnolds Park
 Milford (partial)
 Okoboji (southeast three-quarters)
 Spirit Lake (vast majority)
 West Okoboji (partial)

Adjacent townships
 Spirit Lake Township (north)
 Superior Township (northeast)
 Richland Township (east)
 Lloyd Township (southeast)
 Milford Township (south)
 Okoboji Township (southwest)
 Lakeville Township (west)
 Diamond Lake Township (northwest)

Cemeteries
The township contains these three cemeteries: Lake View, Lakeland Memory Gardens and Rose Hill.

Major highways
  U.S. Route 71
  Iowa Highway 9

Airports and landing strips
 Airport Okoboji
 Dickinson County Memorial Hospital Heliport
 Lake Okoboji Seaplane Base
 Spirit Lake Municipal Airport

Lakes
 Center Lake
 Lower Gar Lake
 Minnewashta Lake
 Prairie Lake
 Upper Gar Lake

Landmarks
 Pillsbury Point State Park
 Summer Circle Park

School districts
 Okoboji Community School District
 Spirit Lake Community School District

Political districts
 Iowa's 5th congressional district
 State House District 06
 State Senate District 03

References
 United States Census Bureau 2007 TIGER/Line Shapefiles
 United States Board on Geographic Names (GNIS)
 United States National Atlas

External links

 
US-Counties.com
City-Data.com

Townships in Dickinson County, Iowa
Townships in Iowa
1866 establishments in Iowa